Anaphantis is a genus of moths of the family Yponomeutidae.

Species
Anaphantis aurantiaca - Lucas, 1889 
Anaphantis aurifraga - Diakonoff, 1948 
Anaphantis isochrysa - Meyrick, 1907 
Anaphantis protona - Meyrick, 1910 
Anaphantis zonotorna - Meyrick, 1925 

Yponomeutidae